Khabib Syukron (born on February 15, 1988) is an Indonesian footballer who currently plays for Gresik United in the Indonesia Super League.

References

1988 births
Association football defenders
Association football midfielders
Living people
Indonesian footballers
Liga 1 (Indonesia) players
Gresik United players
Indonesian Premier Division players
Persebaya Surabaya players
Sportspeople from Jakarta